The Stadium District is a neighborhood of the north end of Tacoma, Washington, USA. It is named after Stadium High School, a historic landmark.

The district is located between the North Slope residential neighborhood and the Stadium Business District and the Hilltop neighborhood further to the south.  The area shares more in common with Tacoma's downtown owing to its urban nature and large population of apartment-dwelling working class residents. The area consists primarily of single family homes, apartment & condominium buildings, some with views of Commencement Bay.

Old Woman's Gulch 
Old Woman's Gulch is a ravine, or system of ravines, located in the north end of Tacoma, Washington.

Originally named after the old longshoremen's widows who were displaced during the construction of the sports field that gave Stadium High School its namesake, the original Old Woman's Gulch is located in the Stadium District. At a later date, the name "Old Woman's Gulch" was also used to describe the gulch system that runs through the entirety of the north end, including the more residential areas to the west of the Stadium District, near the Proctor District. Today, few people are aware that the ravine is known as the Old Woman's Gulch, instead referring to it simply as "the gulch" or "the ravine."

References

External links
Tacoma Stadium Historical & Business District

North Tacoma, Washington
Neighborhoods in Tacoma, Washington
National Register of Historic Places in Tacoma, Washington
Historic districts on the National Register of Historic Places in Washington (state)